Elon University is a private university in Elon, North Carolina. Founded in 1889 as Elon College, Elon is organized into six schools, most of which offer bachelor's degrees and several of which offer master's degrees or professional doctorate degrees.

Located in North Carolina's Piedmont region, Elon is situated on a  suburban campus between the cities of Greensboro and Raleigh. Less than twenty percent of Elon's undergraduates are native to the state of North Carolina. Elon's intercollegiate athletic teams compete in NCAA Division I athletics as a member of the Colonial Athletic Association.

History 

Elon College was founded by the Christian Connection, which later became a part of the United Church of Christ.  The charter for Elon College was issued by the North Carolina legislature in 1889.  William S. Long was the first president, and the original student body consisted of 76 students. In 1923, a fire destroyed most of the campus, including school records, classrooms, the library, and the chapel. The Board of Trustees voted to rebuild immediately.  Many of the buildings that were erected in the years following the fire still stand and make up the bedrock of Elon's campus.

An institution that for many years enrolled mostly North Carolina residents, Elon began to enroll significant numbers of students from the mid-Atlantic states in the mid-1970s, and began to improve its academic standards for admission. By the start of the 21st century, about 68 percent of Elon's students came from out-of-state and were only accepted if they met high academic standards. Elon became known as a selective university and, by 2013, 82% of incoming students were from out of state. Elon's transformation was the subject of an academic study by George Keller of the University of Pennsylvania titled Transforming a College: The Story of a Little Known College's Strategic Climb to National Distinction. The study, published by Johns Hopkins University Press, depicted how Elon transformed itself from a regional religious college to a selective, nationally recognized university.

Elon is no longer affiliated with the United Church of Christ. Elon's mission statement states that the university "embraces its founders' vision of an academic community that transforms mind, body, and spirit and encourages freedom of thought and liberty of conscience," and emphasizes its commitment to "nurture a rich intellectual community characterized by student engagement with a faculty dedicated to excellent teaching and scholarly accomplishment."

On October 9, 2017, the Elon Board of Trustees elected Dr. Constance "Connie" Ledoux Book as the ninth president of the university. Book became Elon's first female President on March 1, 2018.

Academics 

The university includes Elon College, the College of Arts and Sciences; the Martha and Spencer Love School of Business; the School of Communications; the Dr. Jo Watts Williams School of Education; the School of Law; and the School of Health Sciences. Master's programs are offered in business administration, business analytics, accounting, interactive media, education, physician assistant studies, and doctoral programs include physical therapy and law. Elon operates on a 4-1-4 academic calendar, including a four-week term in January known as Winter Term.

In 2009, the Phi Beta Kappa Society voted to establish a chapter at Elon.

Elon is accredited by the Southern Association of Colleges and Schools.

Elon College, the College of Arts and Sciences 
Elon College, the College of Arts and Sciences, offers 51 undergraduate majors within three divisions: the Arts and Humanities, the Social and Behavioral Sciences, and the Natural, Mathematical and Computational Sciences.  Elon College is the largest of the university's colleges.

Martha and Spencer Love School of Business 

The Martha and Spencer Love School of Business offers undergraduate degrees in accounting, business administration, economics, entrepreneurship, finance, international business, management, and marketing.

School of Communications 
The Elon School of Communications is one of 18 accredited communications programs for private universities in the US by the Accrediting Council for Education in Journalism and Mass Communications (ACEJMC). The program encompasses 20% of students and is divided into six main concentrations: Journalism, Strategic Communications, Cinema & Television Arts, Communication Design, Media Analytics and Sport & Event Management.

School of Law 

The Elon University School of Law opened on August 10, 2006. The School is located in downtown Greensboro, North Carolina in the former city library. Former United States Supreme Court Associate Justice Sandra Day O'Connor delivered the Dedication Address on September 19, 2006. The School of Law houses a working court—the North Carolina Business Court.

School of Health Sciences 

Established in April 2011, Elon's School of Health Sciences offers a doctor of physical therapy (DPT) program and a physician assistant (PA) studies master's program. The University also offers a Bachelor of Science in Nursing (BSN) for students. This program is offered both as a four-year BSN program for undergraduates and an accelerated BSN for those who have already earned a bachelor's degree in another field of study.

Dr. Jo Watts Williams School of Education 

The Dr. Jo Watts Williams School of Education offers both licensure and non-licensure undergraduate majors, as well as Master of Education (M.Ed.) and Master of Arts in Higher Education (MHE) degrees.

Admissions 
For the class of 2024, the university received approximately 15,306 applications from early decision, early action, regular decision, and transfer applicants. From the application pool, around 1,587 students enrolled with an acceptance rate of 71%. The average student coming to Elon in the class of 2024 had a grade point average of 4.04, an average SAT score of 1233, and an ACT average of 27.

Rankings and reputation 

U.S. News & World Report ranks Elon tied for #83 overall among national universities and as #1 in the country for "Best Undergraduate Teaching." Elon is ranked as the #9 most innovative national university. In 2020 Elon was the only university with top-10 rankings in all of U.S. Newss "Academic Programs to Look For" categories.

Student body 
Elon has a student body of 6,291 undergraduate students and 826 graduate students. Approximately 60% of students are female. Elon students come from 46 states and 49 countries; the leading suppliers of undergraduates are North Carolina, Massachusetts, Connecticut, New Jersey, New York, Virginia and Maryland.

Athletics

Elon's 17 varsity sports teams, known as the Phoenix, joined the NCAA's Division I Colonial Athletic Association on July 1, 2014, after a decade in the Southern Conference. Intercollegiate sports include baseball, basketball, cross-country, football, golf, soccer, and tennis for men, and basketball, cross-country, golf, indoor track, outdoor track, soccer, softball, tennis, lacrosse, and volleyball for women. The football team competes in the Division I Football Championship Subdivision (formerly I-AA).

Campus Recreation offers intramural and club sports programs, such as baseball, cycling, lacrosse, flag football, equestrian, swimming, rugby union, triathlon, water skiing, ice hockey and Ultimate Frisbee. During Winter Term the intramurals include bowling, arena football, dodgeball, ultimate frisbee, and a monster golf tournament.

Up until 2000, the mascot of Elon was the Fighting Christian. Early Elon athletic teams were known as the "Christians" with the name "Fighting Christians" gaining popularity by 1923. The nickname was chosen due to Elon's proximity to the Wake Forest Demon Deacons, Guilford Quakers, and the Duke Blue Devils. As Elon committed itself to diversity, and the number of non-Christian students increased, the decision was made to change Elon's mascot. In 2000, a new mascot was adopted, the Phoenix. The choice came from the 1923 fire that destroyed almost the entire campus and the college's subsequent recovery.

Facilities 
Elon's sports facilities include two gymnasiums, Schar Center, Walter C. Latham Baseball Park, Rhodes Stadium, Rudd Field, Hunt Softball Park, Alumni Field House, Koury Field House, Jerry and Jeanne Robertson Track and Field Complex, six club athletic fields, Worseley Golf Center, and Koury Center, which features the 2,400 seat Alumni Gym, an aerobic fitness center, a weight room, racquetball courts, an indoor pool, and a dance studio. The Jimmy Powell Tennis Center, a twelve-court complex, won an "Outstanding Facility Award" from the United States Tennis Association. The  facility at the north end of Rhodes Stadium in the North Athletics Complex is the new headquarters for Phoenix athletics. Construction was completed on the 5,100-seat Schar Center in 2018. The Schar Center is the home to Elon's basketball and volleyball programs, as well as a venue for other major Elon events, such as convocation.

Campus 

Elon's historic campus is located in the Piedmont region of North Carolina, adjacent to Burlington, a city of 50,000. Elon is 20 minutes from Greensboro and within a one-hour drive of many other universities including Duke, NC State, UNC-Chapel Hill, UNC-Greensboro, North Carolina A&T State University, Guilford College, and Wake Forest.

Elon's  campus is divided into seven major neighborhoods: Historic Campus, Central Campus, Global Neighborhood, The Oaks, The Station at Mill Point, Danieley Center, East Neighborhood, The Colonnades, and South Campus. There are 77 residence buildings on campus and 34 academic buildings.  Elon also has numerous lakes and fountains throughout its campus. The Elon College Historic District and Johnston Hall are listed on the National Register of Historic Places.

Spike Lee used Elon as one of the university locations for the movie He Got Game. The Alamance Building, Fonville Fountain, and the Moseley Center's outside patio were the setting for the movie's "Tech University".

Campus life 
The university has more than 250 campus organizations and programs, including 12 national fraternities and 13 national sororities.

Student media
The Pendulum, Elon's undergraduate weekly newspaper is published every Wednesday. WSOE, the university's student-run non-commercial campus radio station, has been airing since 1977. ESTV (Elon Student Television) is the Student television station featuring numerous student-created and -run programs.

In 2016, with advice of their faculty advisers, the two largest student media organizations on campus; Elon Local News (ELN) and The Pendulum newspaper, merged to form the new Elon News Network (ENN). ENN now operates out of the newly constructed newsroom in the McEwen Building of the School of Communications. Following a 2016 expansion of facilities, The School of Communications consists of Iris Holt McEwen Hall, the Snow Family Grand Atrium, Turner Theatre, Dwight C. Schar Hall, Steers Pavilion, and Long Hall, which houses the MA in Interactive Media graduate program and the sport management major.

Extra-curricular organizations
Numerous student government, special interest, and service organizations are represented on campus, including Elon Volunteers, Habitat for Humanity, Model UN, Epsilon Sigma Alpha, Omega Psi Phi, Alpha Phi Omega, the Inter-Residence Council, the Elon University Student Government Association, and the Student Union Board. Cultural groups on campus include the Asian-Pacific Islander Student Association, Black Student Union, the Caribbean Student Association, Hillel, Intercultural Club, and Spectrum (Gay-Straight Alliance).

Elon is home to the Fire of the Carolinas Marching Band (FOTC), which delivers pre-game, halftime, and occasionally post-game performances at home football games. The band also includes color guard (flag spinning) and dance auxiliary squads.

Religious life 

Religious groups on campus include Catholic Campus Ministry, Hillel: The Foundation for Jewish Campus Life, InterVarsity Christian Fellowship, the Iron Tree Blooming Meditation Society, the Muslim Student Association, Baptist Student Union, and Campus Outreach.

The Jewish population at Elon has grown especially rapidly in recent years, with twelve percent of recent classes self-identifying as Jewish. Elon was profiled in Reform Judaism magazine in 2011 as a school which has "gone the extra mile" to make itself more attractive to Jewish students, and since 2013 it has been listed as one of the "top schools Jews choose." The Muslim student population is small but has increased dramatically in size in recent years, and a Muslim Student Association formed at Elon in 2011. The Hindu population has also increased in size, Hindu festivals have become an important part of the university calendar, and Hindu students report feeling accepted at Elon.

Elon worked closely with the Interfaith Youth Core in developing religious diversity and interreligious dialogue. The Truitt Center for Spiritual and Religious Life, located within the Numen Lumen Pavilion of the Academic Village, serves a wide variety of purposes and all religious traditions.

Fraternity and sorority life 
Elon University recognizes 27 social Greek organizations. Forty-four percent of undergraduate students belong to one of the following campus-chartered organizations.

Student traditions
At the start of each school year, Elon University holds a New Student Convocation ceremony for first year and transfer students. It is held "Under the Oaks" behind the West Dormitory. Each new student receives their own acorn at the close of the ceremony to symbolize their beginning at Elon. Upon graduation, each student receives an oak sapling, which is supposed to symbolize their growth at the university as well as the growth in their own lives. The use of the acorn and oak sapling is significant because Elon was named after the Hebrew word for "oak" because of the grove of oak trees it was founded on. The Oak Sapling tradition began in 1991, and the Acorn tradition began in 1999 after Leo Lambert became president of the university.

Notable faculty 
 

Crista Arangala - mathematician
Shane Atkinson – imam and chaplain
Connie Ledoux Book – ninth president of Elon
Jan Boxill – ethicist
Peter S. Brunstetter – Professor of Law, and member of the North Carolina General Assembly
Cardon V. Burnham – composer, arranger, conductor, and performer
Ann J. Cahill – feminist philosopher
Eileen Claussen – American climate and energy policy administrator, diplomat, and executive-in-residence at Elon
Geoffrey Claussen – rabbi, Jewish ethicist and theologian
David M. Crowe – historian
James Danieley – sixth president of Elon
James G. Exum – Distinguished Professor of the Judicial Process at the Elon Law School
David Gergen – inaugural Isabella Cannon Distinguished Visiting Professor of Leadership at Elon
Thomas S. Henricks – professor of sociology
David C. Joyce – now president of Brevard College
Leo Lambert – eighth president of Elon
Sandra Lawson – sociologist, rabbi and chaplain
Elliot Mazer – audio engineer and music professor
Jon Metzger – Professor of Music and artist-in-residence
Paul Neebe – classical trumpeter and former professor of music at Elon
Guy Owen – novelist
Rebecca Todd Peters – feminist Christian ethicist
Jeffrey Pugh – theologian
Michael Skube – journalist on the faculty of the Elon University School of Communications
Megan Squire - computer scientist
Justin Tornow – dancer and choreographer
A. R. Van Cleave – professor of philosophy and football coach
Anthony Weston – philosopher and environmental ethicist
Tripp York – religious studies scholar
James Fred Young – seventh president of Elon

Notable alumni

Academia 

 John Decatur Messick – Former President of East Carolina University (1947–1959)
 H. Shelton Smith – scholar of religion at Duke University
 Drew Van Horn - President of Young Harris College (from 2017); former President of Brevard College (2002-2011)

Arts, literature, and entertainment 

 Rich Blomquist – Emmy Award-winning writer on The Daily Show
 Reno Collier – standup comic, host of NBC's The Great American Road Trip
 Mark St. Cyr – actor, plays Mr. Mazzara on the Disney+ series High School Musical: The Musical: The Series
 Lisa Goldstein – actress, plays Millicent Huxtable on the CW series One Tree Hill
 Grant Gustin – actor Glee, The Flash
 Tal Henry – orchestra director
 Maity Interiano – journalist and television producer
 Christopher Knight – filmmaker, blogger, and Internet personality
 Tyler Marenyi – American DJ and producer
 H. Reid – American writer, photographer, and historian
 Martin Ritt – director, actor, and playwright (Hud, Norma Rae, Stanley & Iris)
 Brent Sexton - actor (Bosch, Deadwood)
 Mike Trainor – standup comic, panelist on TruTV's The Smoking Gun Presents: World's Dumbest...
 Taylor Trensch – Broadway actor (Dear Evan Hansen, Hello Dolly, Curious Incident of the Dog in Night-Time)
 Kenneth Utt – actor and producer (The Silence of the Lambs, Midnight Cowboy, Philadelphia)
 Barrett Wilbert Weed – Broadway actress (Heathers: The Musical, Mean Girls (musical))
 Chris Wood – actor (The Vampire Diaries, Containment, Supergirl)

Politics and military 

 Cary D. Allred – North Carolina politician
 Harris Blake – North Carolina politician
 Cameron DeJong – New Hampshire politician
 Anthony Foriest – North Carolina politician
 Admiral William E. Gortney – Commander, NORAD and US Northern Command
 Hugh Holliman – North Carolina House of Representatives Majority Leader
 Phillip Kellam – Virginia politician
 Nat Robertson – Fayetteville, North Carolina mayor

Sports 

 Tal Abernathy – Major League Baseball pitcher
 Jesse Branson – National Basketball Association and American Basketball Association player
 John Brebbia – Major League Baseball pitcher for the San Francisco Giants
 Elijah Bryant (born 1995) - basketball player in the Israeli Basketball Premier League
 Ward Burton – NASCAR auto racer
 Cap Clark – Major League Baseball catcher
 Billy Devaney – general manager of the St. Louis Rams
 Bill Dougherty – running back for the New Orleans Saints
 Wes Durham – radio play-by-play announcer for the Georgia Tech Yellow Jackets and the Atlanta Falcons
 Joey Hackett – tight end for the Denver Broncos and Green Bay Packers
 Frank Haith – head basketball coach at the University of Tulsa
 Greg W. Harris – Major League Baseball pitcher
 Bunn Hearn – Major League Baseball pitcher
 Clint Irwin – Colorado Rapids goalkeeper
 Don Kernodle – professional wrestler
 Steven Kinney – defender for the Chicago Fire
 Daniel Lovitz – defender for the Nashville SC
 Rich McGeorge – tight end for the Green Bay Packers
 Jack McKeon – Major League Baseball Manager
 Aaron Mellette – Baltimore Ravens wide receiver 
 Jim Morris – head baseball coach at the University of Miami
 Chad Nkang – former linebacker for the Jacksonville Jaguars
 Blake Russell – Olympic runner
 Tony Settles – linebacker for the Washington Redskins
 Ed Sauer – Major League Baseball outfielder
 Jim Schlossnagle – head baseball coach at Texas Christian University
 Jimmy Smith (running back) – former American football running back in the National Football League
 Dick Such – Major League Baseball pitcher and coach
 Oli Udoh - offensive lineman for the Minnesota Vikings
 Joe West – Major League Baseball umpire
 Joe Winkelsas – Major League Baseball pitcher
 Deborah A. Yow – North Carolina State University Athletics Director, formerly University of Maryland's Director of Athletics

References

External links 
 
 Elon Athletics website

 
Educational institutions established in 1889
United Church of Christ in North Carolina
Universities and colleges accredited by the Southern Association of Colleges and Schools
Private universities and colleges in North Carolina
Education in Alamance County, North Carolina
Buildings and structures in Alamance County, North Carolina
Tourist attractions in Alamance County, North Carolina
1889 establishments in North Carolina